The year 1672 in music involved some significant events.

Events
March – Jean-Baptiste Lully quarrels with his regular collaborator, the playwright Molière, who brings in Marc-Antoine Charpentier to replace him.
December 30 – John Banister begins Europe’s first major commercial public concert series at Whitefriars in the City of London.
Arcangelo Corelli visits Paris, where he incurs the jealousy of Jean-Baptiste Lully.

Publications
New Court Songs
Thomas Salmon – Observations upon a Late Book

Classical music
Dietrich Buxtehude – Auf stimmet die Saiten, BuxWV 116
Marc-Antoine Charpentier
Messe pour les trépassés, H.2
Messe à 8 voix et 8 violons et flûtes, H.3
Messe à quatre choeurs, H.4
Te Deum, H.145
Symphonies pour un reposoir, H.515
Jean-Baptiste Lully
Marche
Les folies d'Espagne
Francesco Passarini – Compieta concertata..., Op. 3 (Bologna: Giacomo Monti)
Heinrich Schütz – Matthäus-Passion
Johann Sebastiani – Matthaus-Passion

Opera
Antonio Draghi – Gl'atomi d'Epicuro
Juan Hidalgo de Polanco – La estatua de Prometeo
Antonio Masini – Achille in Siro
Giovanni Maria Pagliardi – Caligula delirante
Antonio Sartorio – Adelaide

Births
January 16 – Francesco Mancini, composer (died 1737)
March 21 – Stefano Benedetto Pallavicino, librettist for Agostino Steffani, Antonio Lotti and others (died 1742)
April 6 – André-Cardinal Destouches, French composer of opera (died 1749)
May 1 – Joseph Addison, English lyricist, essayist, and politician (died 1719)
June 11 – Francesco Antonio Bonporti, priest and composer (died 1748)
September 8 (baptized) – Nicolas de Grigny, organist (died 1703)
November 6 – Carlo Agostino Badia, court composer (died 1738)
December 21 – Benjamin Schmolck, hymn-writer (died 1737)
date unknown – Carlo Agostino Badia, opera composer (died 1738)

Deaths
January – Denis Gaultier, lutenist and composer (born 1603)
January 15 – John Cosin, English translator of "Veni Creator Spiritus" (born 1594)
March 8 – Nicolaus Hasse, composer (born c. 1617)
June 17 – Orazio Benevoli, composer (born 1605)
July 13 – Henry Cooke, actor, singer and composer (born 1616)
August 9 – José Ximénez, organist and composer (born 1601)
September 16 – Anne Bradstreet, lyricist/poet (born 1612)
November 6 – Heinrich Schütz, composer (born 1585)
December 17 – Giovanni Antonio Boretti, composer
date unknown
Jacques Champion de Chambonnières, French harpsichordist and composer (born c.1601)
Valentino Siani, Italian violin-maker (born c. 1595)
probable – François Dufault, lutenist and composer (born c.1604)

References

 
17th century in music
Music by year